Chloroclystis palmaria is a moth in the family Geometridae first described by Louis Beethoven Prout in 1928. It is found on Sumatra, Java and Peninsular Malaysia.

Subspecies
Chloroclystis palmaria palmaria
Chloroclystis palmaria phantastes Prout, 1958

References

External links

Moths described in 1928
palmaria